Texas Killing Fields (also known as The Fields) is a 2011 American crime film directed by Ami Canaan Mann and starring Sam Worthington, Jeffrey Dean Morgan, Jessica Chastain and Chloë Grace Moretz. It competed in the 68th Venice International Film Festival.

Several killings occur along Houston's I-45 corridor between Houston and Galveston, in and around an area known as "the Killing Fields". The film's screenplay was loosely inspired by true events surrounding the murders of women kidnapped from cities spread along 30-plus miles of the I-45 corridor and dumped in many areas, including various bayous surrounding the oil fields of Texas City, Texas. While in real life there have been several itinerant serial killers involved over the years, the film focuses on specific local Texas City suspects.

Plot 

Souder, a homicide detective in a small Texan town, and his partner, transplanted New York City cop Detective Heigh, track a sadistic serial killer dumping his victims' mutilated bodies in a nearby marsh locals call 'The Killing Fields'. Though the swampland crime scenes are outside their jurisdiction, Detective Heigh is unable to turn his back on solving the gruesome murders. Despite his partner's warnings, he sets out to investigate the crimes. Before long, the killer changes the game and begins hunting the detectives, teasing them with possible clues at the crime scenes while always remaining one step ahead. When familiar local girl Anne goes missing, the detectives find themselves racing against time to catch the killer and save the young girl's life.

Cast
 Sam Worthington as Detective Mike Souder
 Jeffrey Dean Morgan as Detective Brian Heigh
 Jessica Chastain as Detective Pam Stall
 Chloë Grace Moretz as Little Anne Sliger
 Jason Clarke as Rule
 Jon Eyez as Levon
 Annabeth Gish as Gwen Heigh
 Sheryl Lee as Lucie Sliger
 Stephen Graham as Rhino
 James Hébert as Eugene Sliger
 Deneen Tyler as Lady Worm
 Sean Michael Cunningham as Sean Heigh
 Leanne Cochran as Lila
 Tony Bentley as Capt. Bender
 Holly Ladnier as Emergency Call Director
 Kirk Bovill as Boyfriend

Production
The film was originally going to be directed by Danny Boyle before he left the project and was replaced by Ami Canaan Mann, daughter of director Michael Mann, who produced the film. Boyle said that the film was "so dark it would never get made".

The film was distributed overseas by Entertainment Film Distributors, a British company. Filming began on May 3, 2010, in Louisiana, United States.

Soundtrack
The soundtrack was scored by Dickon Hinchliffe (formerly of Tindersticks) except for three tracks credited to The Americans.

Reception
Texas Killing Fields received mixed to negative reviews from critics. Review aggregate Rotten Tomatoes gave the film a score of 37% based on 46 reviews, with a consensus that read: "Texas Killing Fields is a competent boilerplate crime thriller, brewing up characters and plots used in better films." Metacritic gave the film a rating of 49/100, based on 17 reviews.

Roger Ebert of The Chicago Sun Times gave the film two out of four stars and said, "Texas Killing Fields begins along the lines of a police procedural and might have been perfectly absorbing if it had played by the rules: strict logic, attention to detail, reference to technical police work. Unfortunately, the movie often seems to stray from such discipline." Betsy Sharkey of the Los Angeles Times commented that "like the Texas City killer's plans, something's gone terribly wrong" with the film. On a more lenient note, James Mottram of GamesRadar wrote: "Mann Jr. shows plenty of promise in a film that doesn’t tarnish the family name. But hindered by niggling flaws, it hardly revolutionises an over-saturated genre."

References

External links
 
 
 

2011 films
2011 crime films
2010s American films
2010s English-language films
American mystery films
American serial killer films
Films about missing people
Films directed by Ami Canaan Mann
Films produced by Michael Mann
Films set in Texas
Films shot in Louisiana
QED International films